The Case Study House No. 28, at 91 Inverness Rd., Thousand Oaks, California, is the only Case Study House in Ventura County. Built during 1965–66, it was listed on the National Register along with several other Case Study Houses in Los Angeles County on July 24, 2013, as part of the "Case Study House Program NPS". This one-story flat-roofed house, designed by architects Conrad Buff and Donald Hensman of the firm Buff and Hensman, was the last family home built in the program and one of the largest at 4,500 square feet. The architects designed the house with classic concept in modern architecture of merging interior and exterior spaces through glass expanses and seamless materials. Face brick was incorporated into the house since it is located on a knoll overlooking a development where this was the unifying material. Previous houses in the program consisted primarily of glass and exposed steel, but the Janss Development Corporation and Pacific Clay Products wanted to demonstrate the advantages of the alternative material.

Decorative iron gates at the entrance frame the center courtyard that has a swimming pool. Along with the brick face, the house has more than 4,000 square feet of glass windows that are shaded by overhangs. The owners described how they considered installing double paned glass but found it would not fit into the steel frame; the single paned glass makes the house hot in the summer and cold in the winter. Solar panels have been put on the roof along with replacing the asphalt and gravel material, popular at the time the house was constructed, with white foam.

When the current owners purchased the house in 1987, the previous owners had shared media coverage about the house with them. In 2013, the owner said to the local press, "I fell in love with the house. I saw it as a work of art."

See also
National Register of Historic Places listings in Ventura County, California

References

External links
Arts & Architecture case study house program

Houses in Ventura County, California
Buildings and structures in Thousand Oaks, California
Houses completed in 1966
Houses on the National Register of Historic Places in California
National Register of Historic Places in Ventura County, California
History of Ventura County, California
Modernist architecture in California